Salamatpur is a town in the Raisen district of Madhya Pradesh, India.. It is situated 8 km from Sanchi. This place is situated between Bhopal and Vidisha.  

Cities and towns in Vidisha district